Howz Koti (also Romanized as Ḩowẕ Kotī) is a village in Baladeh Kojur Rural District, in the Central District of Nowshahr County, Mazandaran Province, Iran. At the 2006 census, its population was 751, in 195 families.

References 

Populated places in Nowshahr County